Leonardo Azzaro and Alessandro Motti were the defending champions, but only Motti chose to start this year.
He partnered with Daniele Bracciali, however they lost to Brian and Dann Battistone in the quarterfinals.
Frederico Gil and Ivan Dodig defeated Thiago Alves and Lukáš Rosol 6–1, 6–3 in the final.

Seeds

Draw

Draw

References
 Doubles Draw

Tennislife Cup - Doubles
Tennislife Cup